Bekaa II is an electoral district in Lebanon, as per the 2017 vote law. The district elects 6 members of the Lebanese National Assembly - 2 Sunni, 1 Druze, 1 Greek Orthodox, 1 Maronite, 1 Shia. It covers the West Bekaa and the Rashaya districts.

In the 2017 vote law, the Bekaa II constituency retained the borders of the West Bekaa-Rachaya electoral district created by the 2008 Doha Agreement ahead of the 2009 Lebanese general election.

Electorate
Nearly half of the electorate is Sunni (48.8%). 14.8% of the electorate is Druze, 14.7% Shia, 7.42% Greek Catholic, 7.22% Maronite and 7.16% Greek Orthodox.

Below data by qada (district) from 2017;

2009 election
Out of 122,989 eligible voters, 65,545 voted (53% participation).

Greek Orthodox candidate Norma Ferzli obtained 3 votes. There were 398 rejected ballots and 264 blank votes.

2018 election

Candidates
Ahead of the 2018 Lebanese general election, the first to use a proportional representation electoral system, three lists were registered. The Future Movement and the Progressive Socialist Party formed a joint list. Notably this list included Mohammed Qar'awi, owner of the Bekaa Hospital, a personality previously linked to the March 8 Alliance. Amin Wahbi, founder and leader of the Democratic Left Movement was included on the Future list.

The "Best Tomorrow" list was mainly backed by the Amal Movement. In the end the Free Patriotic Movement did not join the Amal-sponsored list, leaving Greek Orthodox candidate Elie Ferzli to join it as an individual.

TV presenter Maguy Aoun was heading a third list, organized by civil society elements.

The Lebanese Forces had tried to form a list with Ashraf Rifi to contest the election, but such a list did not materialize. Likewise, the Lebanese Democratic Party opted to withdrawal its candidate Dr. Nizar Zaki.

Result by lists

Result by candidate

References

Electoral districts of Lebanon